Knighton on Teme is a village and civil parish  in the  Malvern Hills District in  the county of Worcestershire, England.

The parish consists of the village of Newnham Bridge and several small hamlets including Knighton, Bickley, Little London and Woodgates Green. It has a population of around 500 people and about 200 houses. A Norman Romanesque church in the parish, St Michael and All Angels, is a Grade I listed building.

History

Domesday Book states the parish as having a priest in 1086.

References

Villages in Worcestershire
Malvern Hills District